The Caproni Ca.356 was a proposed reconnaissance aircraft developed by the Italian company IMAM in the early forties. It was intended to replace the IMAM Ro.37, and would have been powered by two 1,250 hp Isotta Fraschini Zeta R.C.42 engines, with a wingspan of 65.6 feet (20 meters).

References

Ca.356
Abandoned military aircraft projects of Italy
Low-wing aircraft
Twin piston-engined tractor aircraft